Georges François Bach (born 12 June 1955) is a Luxembourgish politician who served as a Member of the European Parliament from 2009 until 2019. He is a member of the Christian Social People's Party, part of the European People's Party.

He served as Chairman of the Union of Luxembourgish railway employees SYPROLUX   from 2003 to 2009.

References

1955 births
Living people
Christian Social People's Party MEPs
MEPs for Luxembourg 2009–2014
MEPs for Luxembourg 2014–2019